Naha bint Mouknass (born March 10, 1969) is a Mauritanian politician. She was the former Minister for Foreign Affairs and Cooperation of Mauritania, serving in this capacity between 2009 and 2011.

Early life and education
Bint Mouknass was born in 1969 in Nouakchott, the daughter of Hamdi Ould Mouknass, who served as Foreign Minister under Moktar Ould Daddah. Her family belongs to the El-Gor warrior tribe from the Dakhlet Nouadhibou Region.

She attended the Superior Institute of Management in Paris, graduating in 1995.

Career
Following her graduation she returned to Nouakchott to work for the Coca-Cola Company. In 2000 she became the President of the Union for Democracy and Progress. She later became an Advisor to President Maaouya Ould Taya, serving in such a capacity between 2000 and 2001. Following this she was appointed Minister Advisor to the Presidency, serving from 2001 to the military ouster of President Ould Taya in August 2005.

Mouknass speaks both Hassaniya Arabic and French.

Mouknass was appointed as Foreign Minister in 2009, the first woman in Mauritania to head such an important ministry.

References

1969 births
Living people
Female foreign ministers
Foreign ministers of Mauritania
People from Nouakchott
21st-century Mauritanian women politicians
21st-century Mauritanian politicians
Women government ministers of Mauritania
Mauritanian women diplomats